The China Agricultural University Gymnasium is an indoor arena located on the campus of the China Agricultural University in Beijing. It hosted the wrestling events of the 2008 Summer Olympics. The Gymnasium's rooftop has a staggered, stair-like design.

It covers an area of 23,950 square metres and has a capacity of 8,200 which was reduced to 6,000 after the events. It was also turned into a sports complex for students of the China Agricultural University after the Olympic Games.
Construction started the first half of 2005 and was completed in July 2007.

References
 Official website

Venues of the 2008 Summer Olympics
Olympic wrestling venues
Sports venues in Beijing
Indoor arenas in China
University sports venues in China